The Originals (translit. Al Aslyeen) is a 2017 Egyptian mystery drama film directed by Marwan Hamed.

Cast
 Maged El Kedwany as Sameer 'Aliwah
 Khaled El Sawy as Rusdy Abaza
 Mena Shalaby as Thoraya Galal
 Kenda Aloush as Mahitab
 Mohamed Mamdouh

See also
 Cinema of Egypt
 Lists of Egyptian films
 List of Egyptian films of the 2010s
 List of Egyptian films of 2017

References

External links
 
 The Originals on elCinema

2010s Arabic-language films
2017 films
2010s thriller films
2010s mystery films
Egyptian drama films
Egyptian thriller films
Egyptian mystery films
Films directed by Marwan Hamed
Films shot in Egypt
2017 drama films